Luoyang is a town in Ruyuan Yao Autonomous County, Guangdong, China.

Administrative division
As of 2016, the town is divided into one community and twelve villages: 
 Yangsheng Community
 Luoyang
 Shendong
 Pingxi
 Tianluokeng
 Banxing
 Baizhu
 Banchang
 Shuangping
 Gumudong
 Futang
 Yueping
 Yuejie

History
It was formed as a township in 1986. In 1993, it was upgraded to a town. In 2005, Gumushui Town merged into the town.

Geography
The town is situated at northwestern Ruyuan Yao Autonomous County. The town is bordered to the north by the National Forest Park of Nanling Ridge, to the east by Dongping, Dabu and Wujiang District, to the south by Yingde and Qingyuan, and to the west by Yangshan County.

The Boluo River, a tributary of the Bei River, passes through the town.

The Tianjingshan National Forest Park is located in the town.

Economy
The local economy is primarily based upon agriculture and local industry.

The region abounds with potassium and silicon.

Demographics

As of 2018, the National Bureau of Statistics of China estimates the township's population now to be 10,411.

Transportation
The National Highway G323 winds through the town.

References

Bibliography

 

Divisions of Ruyuan Yao Autonomous County